Pentace excelsa is a species of flowering plant in the family Malvaceae sensu lato or Tiliaceae. It is famous for its bright colours and is found only in Peninsular Malaysia.

References

excelsa
Endemic flora of Peninsular Malaysia
Trees of Peninsular Malaysia
Conservation dependent plants
Near threatened flora of Asia
Taxonomy articles created by Polbot